Zawyet el-Maiyitin or Zawyet Sultan or Zawyet el-Amwat is a small village in Egypt, located in the Minya Governorate.

The site has a small step-pyramid of the late 3rd Dynasty, remarkable for being the only pyramid built on the east bank of the Nile. It also comprises rock-cut tombs of the late Old Kingdom.

External links

 EgyptSites article

Archaeological sites in Egypt
Populated places in Minya Governorate